Slávka Frniaková (born 9 March 1979 in Žilina) is a Slovak former basketball player who competed in the 2000 Summer Olympics.

References

1979 births
Living people
Slovak women's basketball players
Olympic basketball players of Slovakia
Basketball players at the 2000 Summer Olympics
Sportspeople from Žilina